Josh Scott may refer to:

 Josh Scott (basketball) (born 1993), American basketball player
 Josh Scott (footballer) (born 1985), English footballer